Leonard Gordon may refer to:

 Leonard Gordon, husband and manager of Puerto Rican actress and singer Rita Moreno
 Leonard A. Gordon, historian of South Asia